The Electronic Journal of Probability is a peer-reviewed open access scientific journal published by the Institute of Mathematical Statistics and the Bernoulli Society. It covers all aspects of probability theory and the current editor-in-chief is Bénédicte Haas (Université Sorbonne Paris Nord). Electronic Communications in Probability is a sister journal that publishes short papers. The two journals share the same editorial board, but have different editors-in-chiefs, each chosen for a three-year period. According to the Journal Citation Reports, the Electronic Journal of Probability has a 2016 impact factor of 0.904.

Recent editors-in-chief 
 Bénédicte Hass (2021-2023)
 Andreas Kyprianou (2018-2020)
 Brian Rider (2015-2017)
 Michel Ledoux (2012-2014)
 Bálint Tóth (2009-2011)
 Andreas Greven (2005-2008)
 J Theodore Cox (2002-2004)
 Richard Bass (1999-2002)
 Krzysztof Burdzy and Gregory Lawler (1995-1999)

References

External links 
 

Probability journals
English-language journals
Publications established in 1995
Institute of Mathematical Statistics academic journals
Creative Commons Attribution-licensed journals